The South-link line is a line of the Taiwan Railways Administration running across the southern tip of the island of Taiwan, connecting the eastern and western coasts. It is 98.2 km long, of which 81.4 km is single-track.

The section between Nanzhou and Linbian railway stations was upgraded from a single-track railway to a dual-track railway while the other sections remains in single-track. In conjunction with electrification works on the line, train platforms are being lengthened and upgraded with better facilities.

History

Japanese authorities had planned for a railway running between Pingtung and Taitung, but were unable to complete it before World War II ended. After the Kuomintang-led government took control, surveys were completed in 1947, 1958, 1963, 1968, and 1976, delineating ten possible routes for the South Link Line. Construction began in July 1980, and was completed in November 1991. Upon its inauguration on 16 December 1991, the South Link Line became the newest standard rail line operated by the TRA, and created an around-the-island railway network. The line began became accessible for public use in February 1992.

In August 2009, sections of the line were badly damaged by floods triggered by Typhoon Morakot. The line was reopened on December 30, 2009.

In September 2010, service was temporarily suspended due to Typhoon Fanapi. The Taimali River had risen substantially and washed away  of railway embankment. The line was reopened on September 29, 2010. The Taiwan Railway Administration plans to spend an additional NT$240 million on a double-tracked,  bridge over the Taimali River to avoid future problems with flooding.

Electrification works on the section from Fangliao Station to Zhiben Station was completed in December 2020 with the first passenger services operating on the 20th. It is expected to be fully completed by March 2024.

Stations

Note: Central Signal Station - Guzhuang Station passes through Daren of Taitung County, Original set Pu'an Signal Station, Now Stop working.

See also
 List of railway stations in Taiwan

References

TRA routes
Railway lines opened in 1991
3 ft 6 in gauge railways in Taiwan
1991 establishments in Taiwan
Southern Taiwan